Paradise Park is a census-designated place (CDP) in Santa Cruz County, California. The 2020 United States census reported Paradise Park's population was 550, which is up from 389 people in the 2010 census.

Paradise Park is separated from the University of California, Santa Cruz campus by Pogonip Park and Highway 9.

Geography
According to the United States Census Bureau, the CDP covers an area of 0.3 square miles (0.7 km), all of it land.

Demographics
The 2010 United States Census reported that Paradise Park had a population of 389. The racial makeup of Paradise Park was 371 (95.4%) White, 2 (0.5%) African American, 3 (0.8%) Native American, 3 (0.8%) Asian, 4 (1.0%) from other races, and 6 (1.5%) from two or more races. Hispanic or Latino of any race were 15 persons (3.9%).

The Census reported that 100% of the population lived in households.

There were 203 households, out of which 28 (13.8%) had children under the age of 18 living in them, 92 (45.3%) were opposite-sex married couples living together, 16 (7.9%) had a female householder with no husband present, 9 (4.4%) had a male householder with no wife present.  There were 6 (3.0%) unmarried opposite-sex partnerships, and 0 (0%) same-sex married couples or partnerships. 77 households (37.9%) were made up of individuals, and 42 (20.7%) had someone living alone who was 65 years of age or older. The average household size was 1.92.  There were 117 families (57.6% of all households); the average family size was 2.44.

The population was spread out, with 36 people (9.3%) under the age of 18, 27 people (6.9%) aged 18 to 24, 44 people (11.3%) aged 25 to 44, 154 people (39.6%) aged 45 to 64, and 128 people (32.9%) who were 65 years of age or older.  The median age was 57.1 years. For every 100 females, there were 90.7 males.  For every 100 females age 18 and over, there were 87.8 males.

The homeowner vacancy rate was 3.1%; the rental vacancy rate was 0%.  349 people (89.7% of the population) lived in owner-occupied housing units and 40 people (10.3%) lived in rental housing units.

History
A group of Freemasons from Fresno, California purchased the 138-acre property for use as a summer retreat in 1924. They laid out streets with names related to Freemasonry.
The area continues to be under the auspices of the Paradise Park Masonic Club, with homes owned by members.

In August 2020, Paradise Park was put under an evacuation order due to the CZU Lightning Complex fires.

References

Census-designated places in Santa Cruz County, California
Census-designated places in California